Salar Kamangar (born 1977 in Tehran) is an Iranian-American senior executive at Google and former CEO of Google's YouTube brand.

Early childhood and education
Salar Kamangar (born in Tehran, Iran) holds a bachelor's degree in Biological Sciences with honors from Stanford University and was the 9th employee to join Google. He joined after graduating from Stanford in 1998.

Google
On October 29, 2010, it was announced that Salar "SK" Kamangar, who was in charge of day-to-day activities, would replace Chad Hurley as CEO of YouTube.  He was replaced as CEO of YouTube on February 5, 2014. His successor at YouTube was Susan Wojcicki.

Prior to that, Kamangar created the company's first business plan and was responsible for its legal and finance functions. From there, he became a founding member of Google's product team, where he worked on consumer projects including the acquisition of DejaNews and the subsequent launch of Google Groups.

References

External links
 Stanford advisor page

Living people
1977 births
Iranian emigrants to the United States
Google employees
Stanford University alumni
YouTube
Businesspeople of Iranian descent